Ultimate Hits: Rock and Roll Never Forgets is a compilation album by American rock singer–songwriter Bob Seger. The double-disc album was released on November 21, 2011, and contains 26 remastered tracks from throughout Seger's career, which spans more than four decades. Included are the original mono version of "Ramblin' Gamblin' Man", Seger's first hit with The Bob Seger System from 1968, the classic Christmas song "The Little Drummer Boy" from 1987's A Very Special Christmas, which makes its first appearance on a Seger album, and previously unreleased cover versions of Tom Waits' "Downtown Train" and Little Richard's "Hey, Hey, Hey, Hey (Going Back to Birmingham)." There is also a Walmart exclusive edition that includes the bonus track "Living Inside My Heart," a song from the soundtrack of the 1986 film About Last Night..., which has also never before been released on any Bob Seger album. Two songs on this compilation album are edited compared to the original releases: "We've Got Tonight" is the single edit, which is about one minute shorter than the album version, and "Katmandu" is a newly edited version which omits the second verse, making the song also about one minute shorter compared to the original album version. In the US it was certified gold and platinum in June 2013 by the RIAA.

Track listing

Charts

Weekly charts

Year-end charts

Certifications

References

2011 compilation albums
Bob Seger compilation albums
Capitol Records compilation albums